Gordus or Gordos, also known as Julia Gordus or Iulia Gordos, and possibly also known as Porotta, was an ancient Greek city located in eastern Lydia (modern western Turkey). It was a strategically important town founded by the Seleucid Kings. The Julio-Claudian emperors of the Roman Empire renamed the city Julia Gordos in the 1st century and the city minted its own coins.

The city achieved the full status of a polis under the Flavian emperors.

It was the home to Appolophanes the physician, and there is epigraphical evidence of both pagans and Christians in the town.

Three bishops of the town are known: Isidor attended Third Council of Constantinople, Neophytus attended the Second Council of Nicaea and Stephen attended the Photian Council of 870. No longer the seat of a residential bishop, it remains a titular see of the Roman Catholic Church.

Its site is located near Eski Gördes in Asiatic Turkey.

References

Populated places in ancient Lydia
Seleucid colonies in Anatolia
Ancient Greek cities in Anatolia
Former populated places in Turkey
Catholic titular sees in Asia
History of Manisa Province
Dioceses established in the 1st century